Avalon at Foxhall is a high-rise building located in Washington, D.C., United States. Its construction was completed in 1982. The building is tied for the seventh-tallest commercial building in Washington, D.C. and tied for the tenth-highest building in Washington, D.C. among all buildings.

The property is owned by AvalonBay Communities, a developer that focuses on rental properties for tenants in their 20s, and is located in a wooded area adjacent to Glover-Archbold Park and near the American University campus. It was originally designed as a condominium but never operated as such. The "Avalon at Foxhall" name was added around 2003, prior to which time the building was known simply by its street address.

See also
List of tallest buildings in Washington, D.C.

References

Skyscraper office buildings in Washington, D.C.
1982 establishments in Washington, D.C.

Office buildings completed in 1982